Pendular water is the moisture clinging to particles, such as soil particles or sand, because of surface tension.

At the moisture content of specific yield, gravity drainage will cease. This term relates to hydrology and groundwater flow.

Notes

External links
 http://www.avalanche-center.org/Education/glossary/pendular-regime.php

Hydrology